Sir Thomas Reginald Groom (1906–1987) was Lord Mayor of Brisbane in Australia from 1955 to 1961.

Early life
Groom was born at Teneriffe, Queensland on 30 December 1906, and educated at Brisbane Grammar School and the University of Queensland, where he was President of the University of Queensland Union.  He graduated in 1932 and joined his father's accountancy firm.

Politics

In 1943 he entered local politics as a Citizens' Municipal Organisation councillor in the Brisbane City Council.  He served two terms as Lord Mayor from 1955.  Despite severe budget restrictions he attempted to improve the city's infrastructure, particularly the water, electricity and sewer networks.  His successor, the Labor Party's Clem Jones, was more successful in these endeavours.

Later life
Following electoral defeat, Groom was knighted in 1961 and returned to a career in accountancy and business.  As well as running his own accountancy firm, during the 1960s and 1970s he served as chairman of Mount Isa Mines, P&O Australia and the Commonwealth Bank, amongst others.

Reg Groom died on 28 June 1987 at Guyra, New South Wales.

See also
University of Queensland Union

References
Australian Dictionary of Biography

1906 births
1987 deaths
Mayors and Lord Mayors of Brisbane
University of Queensland alumni
20th-century Australian politicians